Aristotelia condensata is a moth of the family Gelechiidae. It was described by Edward Meyrick in 1928. It is found in the Atlas Mountains.

References

Moths described in 1928
Aristotelia (moth)
Moths of Africa